Harry Blair may refer to:

Harry Blair, musician in Tennessee Ramblers (North Carolina band)
Harry Blair, character in Farewell Again

See also
Henry Blair (disambiguation)
Harold Blair (1924–1976), Australian singer and Aboriginal activist